Associazione Sportiva Dilettantistica Miglianico Calcio is an Italian association football club, based in Miglianico, Abruzzo. Currently it plays in Promozione.

History 
The club was founded in 1947.

At the end of the 2010–11 Serie D season, Miglianico was relegated to Eccellenza Abruzzo, but on 5 August 2011, it was readmitted to Serie D to fill vacancies.

In the next season 2011–12 it was again relegated to Eccellenza.

Colors and badge 
The team's colors are yellow and dark blue.

References

External links
Official homepage

Football clubs in Abruzzo
Association football clubs established in 1947
1947 establishments in Italy